Bavaria (minor planet designation: 301 Bavaria) is a carbonaceous background asteroid from the intermediate asteroid belt, approximately . It was discovered by Johann Palisa on 16 November 1890 in Vienna.

References

External links 
 Lightcurve plot of 301 Bavaria, Palmer Divide Observatory, B. D. Warner (2004)
 Asteroid Lightcurve Database (LCDB), query form (info )
 Dictionary of Minor Planet Names, Google books
 Asteroids and comets rotation curves, CdR – Observatoire de Genève, Raoul Behrend
 Discovery Circumstances: Numbered Minor Planets (1)-(5000) – Minor Planet Center
 
 

000301
Discoveries by Johann Palisa
Named minor planets
000301
18901116